Ur-Pabilsag (ur-dpa-bil2-sag) was an early ruler of the First Dynasty of Ur in the 26th century BCE. He does not appear in the Sumerian King List, but is known from an inscription fragment found in Ur, bearing the title "Ur-Pabilsag, king of Ur". It has been suggested that his tomb is at the Royal Cemetery at Ur (Grave PG 779). He may have died around 2550 BCE.

It also has been suggested that Ur-Pabilsag was the son of king A-Imdugud, known from grave PG 1236, which is the largest and probably the earliest tomb structure at the Royal Cemetery at Ur. The tomb of Ur-Pabilsag (Grave PG 779) is generally considered as the second oldest at the site, and probably contemporary with grave PG 777, thought to be the tomb of his queen. Meskalamdug (grave PG 755, or possibly PG 789) was his son.

Artifacts
Several artifacts are known from tomb PG 779 at the Royal Cemetery at Ur, such as the famous Standard of Ur, and decorated shell plaques.

See also

Sumer
History of Sumer
Royal Cemetery at Ur
Near Eastern archaeology

References

Sources
Jane McIntosh: Ancient Mesopotamia. ABC-CLIO 2005, p. 73 (restricted online version (google books))
Leonard Woolley: The Sumerians. p. 38 (restricted online version (google books))

External links
Meskalamdug at Bartleby.com (Text snippet from  The Encyclopedia of World History (2001))

26th-century BC Sumerian kings
Sumerian kings
First Dynasty of Ur